Ənvər Məmmədxanlı (until 2008, Kirovkend and Kirovkənd) is a village and municipality in the Ujar Rayon of Azerbaijan.  It has a population of 237.  The village was formerly named for Sergey Kirov and in 2008 renamed for writer Ənvər Məmmədxanlı.

References 

Populated places in Ujar District